Andrei Yuryevich Syomin (born 26 August 1969) is a Russian professional football coach and a former player. He is the manager of FC Zenit Penza.

Personal life
He is a son of Yuri Syomin.

External links
 
 Andrei Syomin at Footballdatabase

1969 births
Footballers from Moscow
Living people
Soviet footballers
Russian footballers
Association football midfielders
Russian Premier League players
FC Fakel Voronezh players
Russian expatriate footballers
Expatriate footballers in Finland
Russian football managers
FC Baltika Kaliningrad managers
FC Mordovia Saransk managers
FC Lokomotiv Moscow players
FC Dynamo Moscow reserves players
Expatriate football managers in Estonia